William Godwin is a biography of the philosopher William Godwin (1756–1836) written by Peter Marshall and first published in 1984 by Yale University Press.

Bibliography

External links 

 
 
 William Godwin at the Yale University Press

1984 non-fiction books
English-language books
Yale University Press books
Biographies about philosophers
Biographies about anarchists